Adílson Luíz Anastácio, or simply known as Adílson (born January 10, 1959) is a Brazilian former football player.

He played for Ponte Preta in the Campeonato Brasileiro.

Personal honors
Japan Soccer League First Division Top Scorer – 1988/89

References

External links

Profile and Action Photos from Que Fim Levou? (in Portuguese)

1959 births
Living people
Brazilian footballers
Brazilian expatriate footballers
Associação Atlética Internacional (Limeira) players
Associação Atlética Ponte Preta players
Sport Club Corinthians Paulista players
Esporte Clube XV de Novembro (Jaú) players
Expatriate footballers in Japan
Japan Soccer League players
Júbilo Iwata players
Association football forwards